The 2013–14 campaign was Huddersfield Town's second consecutive season in the second tier of English football, the Football League Championship.

This was Mark Robins' first full season in charge after being appointed manager on 14 February 2013, during the previous season.

Squad at the start of the season

Kit
The 2013/14 season was the Club's first with technical kit supplier Puma, following the conclusion of the Club's deal with previous supplier Umbro. Rekorderlig Cider and Radian B continued their sponsorship of the home and away shirts, respectively.

The home shirt was a traditional blue and white stripes, complete with white shorts and black socks. The away kit featured a black shirt with red sleeves, and was completed with black shorts and red socks. On 2 August 2013, the Club announced the addition of an all-bright yellow third kit, to be worn the following day at Nottingham Forest. Due to Thornton & Ross's sponsorship of away shirts, Town couldn't wear their Rekorderlig-sponsored home shirt away from home, so this shirt was deemed necessary for away games where black and red could not be worn. These shirts featured the sponsorship of Covonia, one of Thornton & Ross's brands, and 1,000 replicas were produced for sale with profits going to the Huddersfield Town Foundation.

During the course of the season, Alex Smithies wore four different coloured goalkeeper kits, all in the same Puma template.

|
|
|
|
|
|
|

Review
Following the end of the previous season, Town released Scott Arfield, Alan Lee and Tom Clarke. Lee Novak was offered a new deal, but rejected it and rejoined former manager Lee Clark at Birmingham City instead. Two days later, Clarke reunited with Simon Grayson at Preston North End. On 18 July, young midfielder Chris Atkinson was sent on loan to Tranmere Rovers until 2 January 2014. The following day, Scott Arfield joined Burnley on a free transfer after being released by Town. On 7 August, young midfielder Jordan Sinnott joined Bury on loan until 5 January 2014, but his loan was cancelled on 18 October. The following day, winger Kallum Higginbotham left the club, joining Scottish Premiership side Partick Thistle on a two-year deal. On 22 August, young striker Jimmy Spencer joined Football League Two side Scunthorpe United on loan until January. Following his return from Glanford Park, he was released on 31 January 2014. On 31 August, just as the transfer window was closing, talented right-back Jack Hunt left the Terriers for Premier League side Crystal Palace for a fee believed to be around £2 million. Young goalkeeper Lloyd Allinson was sent out on loan to Ilkeston on 27 September. The following day, left-back Liam Ridehalgh joined Tranmere Rovers on a 3-month loan. He would eventually join the Rovers on a permanent basis on 3 January. On 10 October, Cristian López joined Shrewsbury Town on a month's loan, however, his loan was cancelled on 5 November, due to an injury crisis at the club. On 19 November, striker Daniel Carr joined Fleetwood Town on a month's loan. On 20 December, young goalkeeper Ed Wilczynski joined F.C. United of Manchester on a month's loan. At the end of 2013, four of Town's development squad left for pastures new, Dale Hopson joined Darlington 1883, James Burke and Robbie McIntyre joined Bury and Max Leonard joined Brighouse Town. On 24 January, young striker Paul Mullin joined Conference North side Vauxhall Motors on loan for a month, and Chris Atkinson joined Bradford City on loan for the rest of the season. On 31 January, just as the transfer deadline was shutting up, Jon Stead joined Oldham Athletic on a month's loan. On 19 February, defender Jake Carroll joined Bury on a month's loan. The following day, young midfielder Duane Holmes joined fellow Championship side Yeovil Town on a month's loan, which was curtailed on 17 March. On 14 March, Cristian López joined Northampton Town on loan till the end of the season. The following day, striker Martin Paterson joined Bristol City, also for the remainder of the season. On 24 March, Anton Robinson joined Coventry City on loan for the rest of the season.

On 24 June, after a noticeable lack of activity, Town made their first signing of the summer with Jon Stead returning to the club he left in January 2004 on a free transfer, after leaving Bristol City. Also joining Town on the same day was former loan signing Adam Hammill signed on an undisclosed fee from Wolverhampton Wanderers. The following day, Northern Ireland international Martin Paterson signed on a two-year deal following his release by Burnley. On 3 July, Norwich City striker James Vaughan, who had a successful loan spell the previous season, signed on a 3-year deal for an undisclosed fee. On 29 July, Town signed central midfielder Jonathan Hogg on a three-year deal from fellow Championship side Watford for an undisclosed fee. The following day, Spanish striker Cristian López signed from Atlético Baleares on a free transfer on a one-year deal, following a successful trial period. On 10 September, just as the loan window opened, Town signed Welsh international full-back Jazz Richards on a 93-day emergency loan from Premier League side Swansea City. As the loan window closed on 28 November, Town signed striker Harry Bunn on loan from Manchester City until 5 January 2014, mainly to be put into the team's development squad. He then cancelled his contract with City to sign a permanent deal with the Terriers on 20 January, until the end of the season. On 10 January, Town broke their transfer record in completing the signing of the Bermudan international striker Nahki Wells from Bradford City for a fee believed to be in the region of £1.5 million. On 15 January, Town made their 2nd big signing of the window, by bringing in the winger/striker Joe Lolley from Conference Premier side Kidderminster Harriers for a fee in the region of £250,000. On 21 January, Norwegian youth international midfielder Sondre Tronstad signed on a free transfer from IK Start.

Squad at the end of the season

Transfers

In

Loans in

Out

Loans out

Statistics

Overview

League table

Results summary

Results by round

Squad statistics

Appearances and goals

|}

Top scorers

Disciplinary record

Results

Pre–season

Championship

FA Cup

Football League Cup

Under 21s

U21 Professional Development League 2 North

Premier League U21 Cup

References

Huddersfield Town A.F.C. seasons
Huddersfield